The following is a list of heads of government of Turkmenistan since the establishment of that position in 1925.

List of Heads of Government of Turkmenistan (1925–1992)

Turkmen Soviet Socialist Republic (1925–1991)

Chairmen of the Council of People's Commissars

Chairmen of the Council of Ministers

Republic of Turkmenistan (1991–present)

Prime Minister

After the passing of the current Constitution of Turkmenistan in 1992, the position of Prime Minister was abolished and President of Turkmenistan also become Head of Government.

See also
President of Turkmenistan
Vice President of Turkmenistan
State Security Council of Turkmenistan
Republican Party of Turkmenistan

External links
U.S. State Department profile of Turkmenistan
Republican Party of Turkmenistan

Lists of prime ministers by country
Main